Soheila Mansourian (23 September 1988 in Semirom) is an Iranian Wushu athlete and gold medalist at 2014 Sanda World Cup who competes in the sanda 52 kg division. She is sister of Elaheh and Shahrbanoo Mansourian, world's renowned wushu champions. She is member of Iran's women wushu national team. In 2015, she competed in the Kunlun Fight organization. In 2020, she succeeded to enter MMA competitions.

Honours

National 

 Sanda World Cup
 : 2014, Indonesia
 Sanda Asian Championship
 : 2016, Taiwan

Personal 

 Iranian Women's Wushu League (Stars Cup)
  1st place: 2013
  1st place: 2017
  1st place: 2018
 China's Sanda Premier League (SPL)
  2nd place: 2017

Enghelab Sport complex controversy 
The release of a video by Soheila Mansoorian on her Instagram soon created a tense atmosphere against the directors of the Enghelab Sport Complex. The wushu champion, who went to the Enghelab Complex for aerobic training on Thursday 9 July 2020, got into a fight with a security guard because her membership card had expired and, according to her, was expelled from the complex.

References

External links 
 Mansourian on Instagram

See also 
 Elaheh Mansourian
 Shahrbanoo Mansourian

Iranian wushu practitioners
Living people
1988 births
People from Semirom